Malpai Borderlands is a region, or areal feature, along the U.S.-Mexico border at the Arizona and New Mexico state line. It encompasses the extreme southeast corner of Arizona and the southwest corner of New Mexico describe the general vicinity. It includes areas inside the U.S. states of Arizona and New Mexico as well as the Mexican states of Chihuahua and Sonora.

The lowest elevations in this area are about 3,700 feet in the San Bernardino National Wildlife Refuge area. Highest elevation is roughly 8,500 feet above mean sea level (AMSL). Mountain ranges generally run north-south. Terrain is described as including desert shrub, Tobosa grassland, Ponderosa Pine forest, and Douglas Fir. Some cattle ranching takes place in the region. The geomorphic provinces include Madrean and Chihuahuan deserts.

The name "Malpai", relates to a type of "desert pavement", formed by wind (eolian) processes, and is called Malapai.

Variant names
The Borderlands are sometimes referred to by the name of a larger region encompassing Malpai Borderlands: Southwest Borderlands. The name is sometimes misspelled Maipai Borderlands. Some references describe it as being inside the Chihuahuan Desert.

Unofficial extents of the region
Papers on the region describe geographic features that partly define it.

The United States portion of this region probably includes portions of Grant County, New Mexico, Hidalgo County, New Mexico, and Cochise County, Arizona. Major geographic features of the area include portions of the San Simon, San Bernardino, Animas, and Playas valleys as well as rivers of the same name. Except for Arizona's San Simon Valley and San Simon River, the areas mentioned appear to be entirely south of present-day Interstate 10. Government reservations in this region include all of Coronado National Forest (US Forest Service) east of US191 and San Bernardino National Wildlife Refuge, (US Fish and Wildlife Service).

In the Mexican state of Sonora, Dieciocho de Agosto, Sierra de los Ajos (sometimes written Sierra Ajos), Agua Prieta, frontera (frontier), Cañón del Oso and Nogales are mentioned. In the state of Chihuahua, the area of Janos is mentioned.

Variant descriptions
A fire history report on the region suggests some definitions may include areas as far west as the Huachuca Mountains of Arizona.

Area under scientific study
A wide array of individuals and organizations are eyeing competing demands on these lands. The US Forest Service, Arizona Geological Survey, US Geological Survey, Natural Resource Conservation Service (formerly Soil Conservation Service), University of New Mexico, The Nature Conservancy, New Mexico Department of Fish and Game, University of Arizona, and Coronado National Forest have been active in studying the future of the area.

See also
 Madrean sky islands (article with map of area)
 Janos Biosphere Reserve

References

Sources
 "Toward Integrated Research, Land Management, and Ecosystem Protection in the Malpai Borderlands: Conference Summary," Rocky Mountain Research Station Report P-10, US Forest Service, July 1999.
 US Geological Survey web page on region

External links
 Malpai Borderlands Group, (a nonprofit)
 Map of region
  –  

Madrean Region
Malpaíses (landform)
Deserts and xeric shrublands
Temperate coniferous forests
Deserts and xeric shrublands in the United States
Temperate coniferous forests of the United States
Regions of the Western United States
Regions of Arizona
Regions of New Mexico
Chihuahuan Desert
Geography of Chihuahua (state)
Geography of Sonora
Geography of Cochise County, Arizona
Geography of Grant County, New Mexico
Geography of Hidalgo County, New Mexico